A list of songs recorded by American rock band Boston.

List

Notes

References

Boston